Charles Auguste Mengin (5 July 1853 – 3 April 1933), was a French academic painter and sculptor.

He is known for his painting of the Greek poet Sappho, made in 1877, now in the collection of the Manchester Art Gallery, in England.

Early life and education
Mengin was born on 5 July 1853 in Paris to Auguste Charles Victor Mengin, a sculptor who died in 1894 in the 14th arrondissement of Paris. He was educated in both painting and sculpture by Gecker, Alexandre Cabanel, Paul Baudry, and sculptor Aimé Millet, at the École des Beaux-Arts in Paris, .

Career
Mengin mainly painted mythical scenes and portraits. He owes his place in art history mainly to his painting Sappho (1877), which can be seen in the Manchester Art Gallery. Sappho is one of the paintings presented by Umberto Eco in his book The History of Beauty as exemplary of 'romantic beauty'.

Exhibitions
He first exhibited in 1876 at the Paris Salon together with his twin brother, Paul Eugène Mengin (1853-1937). He continued his exhibitions at salons of the Société des Artistes Français until 1927. He won a gold medal at the 1900 World's Fair.

Death
Mengin died in Paris in 1933.

Gallery

Notes

References

External links
 Sappho painting at the Manchester Art Gallery
 Charles August Mengin :: Biography and Image Gallery at ArtMagick at www.artmagick.com

1853 births
1933 deaths
19th-century French painters
French male painters
20th-century French painters
20th-century French male artists
19th-century French male artists